Chalon is a surname, and may refer to:

 Alfred Edward Chalon (1780–1860), Swiss portrait painter
 Anna Chalon, French singer-songwriter
 Christina Chalon (1748-1808), Dutch artist
 Frédéric Chalon (fl. 1801–1821), French musician
 Henry Bernard Chalon (1770–1849), English painter and lithographer
 John James Chalon (1778–1854), Swiss painter
 Jean Chalon (born 1935), French writer, winner of the 1994 Prix Marcel Proust

Chalon's meaning is derived from Old English "chaloun", meaning blanket. The word comes from Châlons-sur-Marne, which was an industrial producer of blankets and is currently called Châlons-en-Champagne